, better known as , is a Japanese gravure idol and former child actress who is represented by the talent agency JMO.

She is nicknamed . She graduated from Ryutsu Keizai University's Department of Sociology.

Biography
In 2007, Minami appeared in Sei Kore GP of Weekly Young Jump.

The same year on September 11, she officially joined the Minamikuzu Shooters' Geinōjin Joshi Futsal. Minami is the youngest in the team and her uniform number is 12. She is participated as a trainee in the team.

On August 18, 2010, Minami joined into a group called Shake and she had done singing activities.

She married professional footballer Nozomi Osako of Verspah Oita on November 1, 2014. They later moved to Oita Prefecture.

Filmography

TV series

References

External links
 Official profile 

Japanese gravure idols
Japanese television personalities
1990 births
Living people
Actors from Saitama Prefecture
Models from Saitama Prefecture